Emergency Declaration ( Bisang Seoneon) is a 2021 South Korean aviation disaster-action film directed by Han Jae-rim and starring Song Kang-ho, Lee Byung-hun, Jeon Do-yeon, Kim Nam-gil, Im Si-wan, Kim So-jin and Park Hae-joon. Filming restarted on September 12, 2020, after postponement due to COVID-19 resurgence in August 2020.  The film was wrapped up on October 24, 2020. 

The film was first screened in the out of competition section of the 74th Cannes Film Festival on July 16, 2021. It was released theatrically in South Korea on August 3, 2022, on a 4DX screen combining 4DX and ScreenX in addition to IMAX.

It is the 8th highest-grossing Korean film of 2022.

Synopsis

An aircraft is forced to declare an emergency when an unprecedented terror occurs inflight.

Cast
 Song Kang-ho as Gu In-ho, detective 
 Lee Byung-hun as Park Jae-hyuk, passenger
 Jeon Do-yeon as Kim Sook-hee, minister
 Kim Nam-gil as Choi Hyun-soo, pilot
 Im Si-wan as Ryu Jin-seok, passenger
 Kim So-jin as Hee-jin, flight attendant
 Park Hae-joon as Tae-su, Blue House Crisis Management Center director
 Ahn Jeong Ho 
 Lee Yul-eum as Park Shi-young, flight attendant
 Moon Sook as Doctor, a passenger who boards the airplane
 Jeon Su-ji as Assistant Oh
 Seol In-ah as Tae-eun, flight attendant
 Jang Seo-yeon as flight attendant
 Kim Gook-hee as Mi-ryang, a passenger who boards an airplane with her friend.
 Woo Mi-hwa as Hye-yoon, In-ho's wife
 Hyun Bong-sik as Yoon Chul, the investigative partner who came with Inho.
 Kim Bo-min as Soo-min, Daughter of Jae-hyuk
 Kwon Han-sol as Min-jung, In-ho's daughter.

Production
On August 29, 2019, Showbox confirmed that Song Kang-ho and Lee Byung-hun have agreed to appear in director Han Jae-rim's next film Emergency Declaration. On 30 March 2020, it was reported that the film has been put on hold due to outbreak of COVID-19. In May 2020, the cast of the film was finalized as Song Kang-ho, Lee Byung-hun, Jeon Do-yeon, Kim Nam-gil, Yim Si-wan, Kim So-jin and Park Hae-joon. Filming began in the same month.

The airplane set, was made by airlifting the entire waste plane from the United States. The motif of the early model of the Boeing 777, was used to create set. With the help of a gimbal with a diameter of 7 meters and a length of 12 meters, it was made to rotate at 360-degree rotation.

On 31 August 2020, the distributors of the film Showbox informed that filming was stopped due to resurgence in COVID-19. The filming restarted on September 12, 2020 and was wrapped up on October 24, 2020. The director on wrap up said, "As a producer and a director, I am very satisfied with the fact that everyone finished shooting well." On post production, the director Han Jae-rim said about the filming and performance, "The set is also a set, but the part to watch out for in the airplane scene is the outstanding performance of the actors. This is what I really want to show off"

Release
Emergency Declaration has been invited to the out of competition section of the 74th Cannes Film Festival to be held from 6 to 17 July 2021.

It had its world premiere on July 16, at the Cannes Film Festival. It was slated to release theatrically in January 2022, but due to a new wave of the COVID-19 pandemic its release was delayed. It was finally released theatrically in South Korea on August 3, 2022 and will be released in the United States on August 12, 2022. The film was released in Singapore, Thailand, Hong Kong, and Malaysia on August 4, and has been invited to the Orbita section, the competition section at 55th Sitges Film Festival to be held from October 6 to  October 16, 2022.

Home media
The film will be released on Coupang Play on September 7, 2022.

Reception

Box office
The film was released on August 3 on 1776 screens. It opened at number 1 place on the Korean box office with 336,751 viewers. It logged one million viewers on fourth day of its release after topping the box office for two days. It took 18 days for the film to surpass 2 million viewers.

, it is the 8th highest-grossing Korean film of 2022 with a gross of US$14.7 million and 2.1 million admissions according to the Korean Film Council.

Critical response
The review aggregator website Rotten Tomatoes reported a 64% approval rating, based on 33 reviews with an average rating of 5.5/10.

Im Soo-yeon of Cine21, stated that the film "resembles director Bong Joon-ho's Monster rather than a Hollywood movie about hijacking or aviation disasters". Concluding, Im wrote, "This is a new film from director Han Jae-rim, who directed Contemplation and The King." Lee Marshall reviewing the film for Screen Daily was critical of the timing of the film. He appreciated the car chase sequence filmed through the windscreen of vehicle in pursuit. Concluding Lee wrote, ".... but the film remains as a series of sketches that are all but erased by the film’s trite and inauthentic ending." Peter Debruge of Variety appreciating the film wrote, "From a storytelling perspective, seeing what Han can do with the interior of a plane — and a whole lot of CGI — is downright inspirational." Jared Mobarak writing in The Film Stage graded the film as B- and wrote, "The plane is in danger. It can't land until a plan to alleviate that danger is made on the ground. Everything that occurs reinforces those two truths. Even so, it's never boring." Laura Sirikul of The Nerds of Color rated the film 3.5/5 and praised, the production design, cinematography, and CGI on the plane interior as "incredible". Sirikul stated, "The film was filled with so many twists and turns that you don’t really notice the long duration. It also amps up the anxiety and stakes by adding more and more surprises."

Therese Lacson writing in Collider graded the film as C+ and wrote, "With so much holding it down, it feels impossible for Emergency Declaration to take flight, and it lives in the shadow of disaster films that capitalize on the hallmarks of its genre, rather than trying to do too much at the same time."

Accolades

References

External links
 
 
 
 
 
 

2021 films
2020s Korean-language films
Films directed by Han Jae-rim
South Korean drama films
South Korean aviation films
South Korean disaster films
South Korean action thriller films
2021 action thriller films
Films about aviation accidents or incidents
Films about aviators
Films about bioterrorism
Films about police officers
Films about terrorism in Asia
Films set in Chiba Prefecture
Films set in Gyeonggi Province
Films set in Incheon
Films set in North Chungcheong Province
Films set in Seoul
Films set in airports
Films set on airplanes
Showbox films
Films postponed due to the COVID-19 pandemic
IMAX films
4DX films
ScreenX films